The following is a list of Ministers of Justice and Law of Colombia.

 Fernando Londono Hoyos was referred to as the Minister of the Interior and in charge of Justice and later as Minister of the Interior and Justice. His successors Sabas Pretelt de la Vega, Fabio Valencia Cossio, Carlos Holguin Sardi and German Vargas Lleras also had the same title.
During his tenure, Lleras would be known as the Minister of Interior that oversaw Justice.

See also 

Anexo:Ministros de Justicia de Colombia (Annex: Ministers of Justice of Colombia)
Ministry of Justice and Law (Colombia)
Justice ministry
 Politics of Colombia

References 

Justice ministries
Government of Colombia